The Board of Inspection and Survey (INSURV) is a United States Navy organization whose purpose is to inspect and assess the material condition of U.S. Navy vessels.

The Board is currently headquartered at Naval Amphibious Base Little Creek, Virginia.

INSURV teams 
The Board performs its tasks by sending out teams at intervals not to exceed 60 months per Naval Ship. These teams evaluate a ship's readiness to conduct combat operations at sea, through an extensive system of checks on installed equipment.

New construction
When a ship has been constructed by a shipyard and turned over to the U.S. Navy, an INSURV team must certify the vessel prior to declaring it operational.

History 
The Board of Inspection and Survey was established by Congress to ensure that the ships of the United States Navy are properly equipped for prompt, reliable, sustained mission readiness at sea. Originally established in 1868 under Admiral David Farragut, the board was reconstituted in 1877 with Admiral David Porter as head of the board, expanding on the tasks he had assumed as duties under an instruction of November 16, 1870.

On August 5, 1882, Congress enacted legislation which established the Board of Inspection and Survey under statutory authority. Commodore Alexander A. Semmes was the first officer to assume the title as President, Board of Inspection and Survey. INSURV has been operating continuously under this authority since that date.

In 2008, six Navy ships, including the destroyer Stout, guided missile cruiser Chosin, and amphibious assault ship New Orleans, failed their INSURV inspections.  More than two dozen other ships were found to have critical deficiencies.  Parting from a past practice of publicly releasing INSURV inspection results, the Navy immediately classified the 2008 reports.  In response, US Senator Jim Webb, in April 2009, asked the Senate Armed Services Committee to look into the Navy's decision.  Said Representative Rob Wittman in support of Webb's action, "I am deeply concerned that a decision to classify these reports across the board would inhibit the Congress' ability to provide necessary and constitutionally mandated oversight."

Mission 

The Secretary of the Navy and the Chief of Naval Operations (CNO) have designated the President, Board of Inspection and Survey (PRESINSURV) as their agent to perform the following statutory, regulatory and contractual requirements:

 Develop and establish CNO policy and procedures for trials, material inspections, and surveys of ships and service craft consistent with law, regulations, and the terms of contract.
 Examine Naval vessels periodically by a board of Naval officers to determine fitness for further service.
 Conduct material inspections and surveys of ships and service craft and provide assessment of the material readiness of these vessels.
 Provide independent verification of a newly constructed ship’s readiness for acceptance/delivery; and to determine if builder responsible equipment is operating satisfactorily during the guarantee period following acceptance.
 Based on observations during Board of Inspection and Survey assessments, provide timely, candid, and accurate findings to Fleet Commanders, Type Commanders, NAVSEA, and appropriate OPNAV offices together with recommended actions where appropriate.
 Conduct environmental protection and NAVOSH oversight inspection of Naval ships to include equipment, program compliance, and training. A combined NAVOSH/EP assessment will be conducted during non-MI Fleet Readiness Periods (FRPs), not to exceed 36 months.
 Compile statistical information and analysis on material deficiencies, providing the CNO, Numbered Fleets, NAVSEA, and other higher authorities such information as they may require.

Presidents of the board

See also
 Composite Training Unit Exercise (COMPTUEX) - tests crew readiness before US warships deploy
 Flag Officer Sea Training (FOST) - British equivalent of INSURV and COMPTUEX

References

External links
 INSURV Home Page
 Board of Inspection and Survey Inspection
 Reuben James Sails with Pride After Successful INSURV
 INSURV Presidents

United States Navy organization